"Can't Shake the Feeling" is a pop-dance song written by Stock Aitken Waterman for British boys band Big Fun. It was the second single from their 1990 debut studio album A Pocketful of Dreams on which it is the third track. Released in November 1989 with two different covers, it enjoyed decent chart trajectories in European countries, although it was unable to meet the same success than Big Fun's previous hit "Blame It on the Boogie". It became a top ten hit in the United Kingdom, Ireland, Spain and Finland, and a top 50 hit in Belgium, France and Germany.

Critical reception
A review in Pan-European magazine Music & Media considered "Can't Shake the Feeling" "one of SAW's better releases", adding it was "a punchy dance number with a lot of spirit that recalls stablemate Kylie Minogue's "I Should Be So Lucky".

Chart performance
"Can't Shake the Feeling" entered the UK Singles Chart at number 27 on 25 November 1989, climbed the following two weeks until reaching a peak of number eight, and charted for a total of nine weeks. In Ireland, it ranked from 30 November 1989 and for three weeks, with a peak at number seven. It was also a top ten hit in Finland and was a hit in Spain where it was much aired on radio, which allowed it to top the airplay chart. However, it achieved a moderate success in other European contries, becoming only a top 40 hit in Belgium (Flanders), and a top 50 hit in France and Germany. Similarly, it just entered the top 100 in Australia, stalling at number 97. On the Eurochart Hot 100, it started at number 86 on 2 December 1989, climbed to a peak of number 32 in its fifth week and fell off the top 100 after eight weeks of presence. On the European Airplay Top 50, it peaked at number 36 and remained on the chart for three weeks.

Formats and track listings
 7" single, Cassette
 "Can't Shake the Feeling" – 3:57
 "Don't Say It's Over" – 3:51

 CD maxi
 "Can't Shake the Feeling" (12" version) – 6:07
 "Don't Say It's Over" – 3:51
 "Can't Shake the Feeling" (instrumental) – 3:51
 "I Feel The Earth Move" (7" version) - 3:29

 12" single
 "Can't Shake the Feeling" (12" version) – 6:07
 "Don't Say It's Over" – 3:51
 "Can't Shake the Feeling" (instrumental) – 3:51

 12" single
 "Can't Shake the Feeling" (remix) – 5:50
 "Don't Say It's Over" – 3:51
 "I Feel The Earth Move" (7" version) - 3:29

Credits and personnel
The following people contributed to "Can't Shake the Feeling":
Karen Hewitt, Yoyo - Engineer 
Dave Ford - Mixing

Charts

References

1989 songs
1990 singles
Big Fun (band) songs
Song recordings produced by Stock Aitken Waterman
Songs written by Mike Stock (musician)
Songs written by Matt Aitken
Songs written by Pete Waterman
Jive Records singles